The 1995 Japan Series was the Nippon Professional Baseball (NPB) championship series for the 1995 season. It was the 46th Japan Series and featured the Pacific League champions, the Orix BlueWave, against the Central League champions, the Yakult Swallows. The series was the second time the two franchises played each other for the championship; however, the last time the two teams played, Orix was known as the Hankyu Braves. Played at Green Stadium Kobe and Meiji Jingu Stadium, the Swallows defeated the BlueWave four games to one in the best-of-seven series to win the franchise's 3rd Japan Series title. Regular-season MVP Tom O'Malley was named Most Valuable Player of the series. The series was played between October 21 and October 26, 1995, with home field advantage going to the Central League.

Summary

Matchups

Game 1

Game 2

Game 3

Game 4

Game 5

See also
1995 World Series

References

External links
 Nippon Professional Baseball—Official website (in English)

Japan Series
1995 Nippon Professional Baseball season
Tokyo Yakult Swallows
Orix BlueWave